Thomas Heathcote (9 September 1917 – 5 January 1986) was a British character actor, a former protégé of Laurence Olivier.

He was educated at Bradfield College in Bradfield, near Reading in Berkshire, England. His films included A Night to Remember (1958), Village of the Damned (1960), Billy Budd (1962), A Man for All Seasons (1966), Night of the Big Heat (1967) and Quatermass and the Pit (1967). On television he had notable guest roles in Dixon of Dock Green, The Prisoner, Z-Cars, The Onedin Line and Crossroads. Heathcote was also a regular actor in BBC radio drama, notably in several series of Paul Temple.

Selected filmography

 Dance Hall (1950) - Fred
 Cloudburst (1951) - Jackie
 Malta Story (1953) - Soldier (uncredited)
 The Sword and the Rose (1953) - Wrestling Second
 The Red Beret (1953) - Alf
 Blood Orange (1953) - Detective Sgt. Jessup
 The Large Rope (1953) - James Gore
 The Seekers (1954) - Sgt. Paul
 Betrayed (1954) - Paratropper Corporal (uncredited)
 Above Us the Waves (1955) - Hutchins
 Doctor at Sea (1955) - Wilson
 The Last Man to Hang (1956) - Bracket
 Eyewitness (1956) - Tom - Barman (uncredited) 
 Tiger in the Smoke (1956) - Rolly Gripper
 Yangtse Incident: The Story of H.M.S. Amethyst (1957) - Mr. Monaghan RN
 A Night to Remember (1958) - Steward
 Tread Softly Stranger (1958) - Sergeant Lamb
 Dial 999 (TV series) ('Commando Crook', episode) (1958)- Sgt. Quigley
 Village of the Damned (1960) - James Pawle
 On the Fiddle (1961) - Sergeant
 Billy Budd (1962) - Alan Payne - Maintopman
 A Man for All Seasons (1966) - Boatman
 Night of the Big Heat (1967) - Bob Hayward
 Quatermass and the Pit (1967) - Vicar
 The Fixer (1968) - Proshko
 Julius Caesar (1970) - Flavius
 The Abominable Dr. Phibes (1971) .- 2nd Policeman
 Burke & Hare (1972) - Paterson
 Demons of the Mind (1972) - Coachman
 Luther (1974) - Lucas
 Trial by Combat (1976) - Tramp
 The Jigsaw Man (1983) - Gamekeeper
 Sword of the Valiant (1984) - Armourer
 The Shooting Party (1985) - Ogden

References

External links

1917 births
1986 deaths
English male stage actors
English male film actors
English male television actors
20th-century English male actors